Under Current is an upcoming Hong Kong action thriller film directed by Alan Mak and starring Aaron Kwok, Simon Yam and Francis Ng. Kwok stars as a barrister who collaborates with a police officer (Ng) to investigate the mysterious death of a financial director (Yam) of a charity organisation.

Production for Under Current officially began on 6 June 2022 and is slated for release in 2023.

Cast
Aaron Kwok as a barrister specialized in criminal cases who is also a taekwondo expert.
Simon Yam as the financial director of a charity organisation.
Francis Ng as a police officer.
Alex Fong as the chairman of a charity organisation.
Kathy Yuen as the manager of a charity organisation.
Niki Chow as a lawyer.
Gladys Li
Power Chan
Felix Lok
Benny Lai
Asano Nagahide
German Cheung
Ernesto de Sousa
Max Cheung 
Peter Chan
Rose Ma
Lily Man

Production
The film was first announced in March 2022 at the Hong Kong International Film & TV Market (FILMART) in March under the title Insider, with Alan Mak set to direct and to star Aaron Kwok, Simon Yam, Raymond Lam, Alex Fong, Kathy Yuen, Niki Chow and Gladys Li, with production slated to begin in May of the same year after it was postponed from February amid the fifth wave of the COVID-19 pandemic in Hong Kong. Kwok was originally scheduled to participate in a film produced in Mainland China in June, but because he had a strong interest in the film's script, Kwok rearranged his schedule to act in the film. Mak revealed the script for film took three years to complete On 11 May, it was reported that Lam had dropped out of the film in favor of participating in a reality TV show in China and was replaced by Francis Ng. Mak originally had William Chan in mind to replace Lam, but instead opt for Ng as the character was a middle-aged man with many life experience.

Principal photography for the film, which is now titled Under Current, began on 6 June 2022, where a production commencement ceremony was held attended by the cast and crew, hosted by Emperor Group chairman Albert Yeung.

References

External links

Upcoming films
2020s action thriller films
2020s martial arts films
Hong Kong action thriller films
Hong Kong martial arts films
Police detective films
Taekwondo films
2020s Cantonese-language films
Films directed by Alan Mak
Emperor Motion Pictures films
Films about lawyers
Films about corruption
Films set in Hong Kong
Films shot in Hong Kong